The 1924 United States presidential election in Wyoming took place on November 4, 1924, as part of the 1924 United States presidential election. State voters chose three representatives, or electors, to the Electoral College, who voted for president and vice president.

Wyoming was won by the 30th president of the United States Calvin Coolidge (R–Massachusetts), running with Director of the Bureau of the Budget Charles G. Dawes, with 52.39 percent of the popular vote, against the 20th Governor of Wisconsin Robert M. La Follette Sr. (P–Wisconsin), running with Senator Burton K. Wheeler, with 31.51 percent of the popular vote and the 14th Solicitor General of the United States John W. Davis (D–West Virginia), running with the 20th and 23rd governor of Nebraska Charles W. Bryan, with 16.11 percent of the popular vote.

Wyoming was one of the thirteen Western and Midwestern states where Robert M. La Follette Sr. placed second, with 31.51 percent of the vote, but the only state that he succeeded in winning was his home state of Wisconsin.

Results

Results by county

See also
 United States presidential elections in Wyoming

Notes

References

Wyoming
1924
1924 Wyoming elections